is a Japanese webtoon series written and illustrated by Atsuko Watanabe, and published by Comico since October 2013. An anime television series adaptation by Zero-G aired from January to March 2017.

Characters

Episode list

References

External links 
  
 

2017 anime television series debuts
Anime series based on manga
Shōnen manga
Japanese webtoons
Zero-G (studio)